Depersonalization-derealization disorder (DPDR, DPD) is a mental disorder in which the person has persistent or recurrent feelings of depersonalization and/or derealization. Depersonalization is described as feeling disconnected or detached from one's self. Individuals may report feeling as if they are an outside observer of their own thoughts or body, and often report feeling a loss of control over their thoughts or actions. Derealization is described as detachment from one's surroundings. Individuals experiencing derealization may report perceiving the world around them as foggy, dreamlike/surreal, or visually distorted.

Depersonalization-derealization disorder is thought to be caused largely by interpersonal trauma such as childhood abuse. Adverse early childhood experiences, specifically emotional abuse and neglect have been linked to the development of depersonalization symptoms. Triggers may include significant stress, panic attacks, and drug use. Those who do have this disorder could be in a depersonalized state for as long as a regular panic attack lasts. However, in some certain situations this state of mind could last either hours, days, and possibly even weeks at a time. In rare cases, symptoms can last for years.

Diagnostic criteria for depersonalization-derealization disorder includes persistent or recurrent feelings of detachment from one's mental or bodily processes or from one's surroundings. A diagnosis is made when the dissociation is persistent and interferes with the social or occupational functions of daily life.

While depersonalization-derealization disorder was once considered rare, lifetime experiences with it occur in about 1–2% of the general population. The chronic form of the disorder has a reported prevalence of 0.8 to 1.9%. While brief episodes of depersonalization or derealization can be common in the general population, the disorder is only diagnosed when these symptoms cause substantial distress or impair social, occupational, or other important areas of functioning.

Signs and symptoms
The core symptoms of depersonalization-derealization disorder is the subjective experience of "unreality in one's self", or detachment from one's surroundings. People who are diagnosed with depersonalization also often experience an urge to question and think critically about the nature of reality and existence.

Individuals with depersonalization describe feeling disconnected from their physicality; feeling as if they are not completely occupying their own body; feeling as if their speech or physical movements are out of their control; feeling detached from their own thoughts or emotions; and experiencing themselves and their lives from a distance. While depersonalization involves detachment from one's self, individuals with derealization feel detached from their surroundings, as if the world around them is foggy, dreamlike, or visually distorted. Individuals with the disorder commonly describe a feeling as though time is passing them by and they are not in the notion of the present. In some cases, individuals may be unable to accept their reflection as their own, or they may have out-of-body experiences. One-third to one-half of patients with DPDR also experience hearing internal voices. This is to differentiate from external voices which are more commonly found in psychosis. Additionally some individuals experience difficulty concentrating and problems with memory retrieval. These individuals sometimes lack the "feeling" of a memory where they are able to recall a memory but feel as if they did not personally experience it. These experiences which strike at the core of a person's identity and consciousness may cause a person to feel uneasy or anxious. The inner turmoil created by the disorder can also result in depression.

First experiences with depersonalization may be frightening, with patients fearing loss of control, dissociation from the rest of society and functional impairment. The majority of people with depersonalization-derealization disorder misinterpret the symptoms, thinking that they are signs of serious psychosis or brain dysfunction. This commonly leads to an increase of anxiety and obsession, which contributes to the worsening of symptoms.

Factors that tend to diminish symptoms are comforting personal interactions, intense physical or emotional stimulation, and relaxation. Distracting oneself (by engaging in conversation or watching a movie, for example) may also provide temporary relief. Some other factors that are identified as relieving symptom severity are diet or exercise, while alcohol and fatigue are listed by some as worsening their symptoms.

Occasional, brief moments of mild depersonalization can be experienced by many members of the general population; however, depersonalization-derealization disorder occurs when these feelings are strong, severe, persistent, or recurrent and when these feelings interfere with daily functioning. DPDR episodes tend to be transient but duration is highly variable with some lasting as long as several weeks.

A growing number of users participating in virtual reality (VR) are facing the hazard of DPDR with dissociative experiences after use. Higher levels of a lessened sense of reality and being easily immersed can occur.

Causes
The exact cause of depersonalization is unknown, although biopsychosocial correlations and triggers have been identified. It has been thought that depersonalization can be caused by a biological response to dangerous or life-threatening situations which causes heightened senses and emotional numbing.

Psychosocial 
There is growing evidence linking physical and sexual abuse in childhood with the development of dissociative disorders. Childhood interpersonal trauma – emotional abuse in particular – is a significant predictor of a diagnosis of DPDR. Compared to other types of childhood trauma, emotional abuse has been found to be the most significant predictor both of a diagnosis of depersonalization disorder and of depersonalization scores, but not of general dissociation scores. Some studies suggest that greater emotional abuse and lower physical abuse predict depersonalization in adult women with post-traumatic stress disorder (PTSD). Patients with high interpersonal abuse histories (HIA) show significantly higher scores on the Cambridge Depersonalization Scale, when compared to a control group. Earlier age of abuse, increased duration and parental abuse tend to correlate with severity of dissociative symptoms. Besides traumatic experiences, other common precipitators of the disorder include severe stress, major depressive disorder, panic attacks, and psychoactive substances. People who live in highly individualistic cultures may be more vulnerable to depersonalization, due to threat hypersensitivity and an external locus of control.

Neurobiology 

There is converging evidence that the prefrontal cortex may inhibit neural circuits that normally form the basis of emotional experience. In an fMRI study of DPDR patients, emotionally aversive scenes activated the right ventral prefrontal cortex. Participants demonstrated a reduced neural response in emotion-sensitive regions, as well as an increased response in regions associated with emotional regulation. In a similar test of emotional memory, depersonalization disorder patients did not process emotionally salient material in the same way as did healthy controls. In a test of skin conductance responses to unpleasant stimuli, the subjects showed a selective inhibitory mechanism on emotional processing.

Studies are beginning to show that the temporoparietal junction has a role in multisensory integration, embodiment, and self-other distinction. Several studies analyzing brain MRI findings from DPDR patients found decreased cortical thickness in the right middle temporal gyrus, reduction in grey matter volume in the right caudate, thalamus, and occipital gyri, as well as lower white matter integrity in the left temporal and right temporoparietal regions. However, no structural changes in the amygdala were observed.

A PET scan found functional abnormalities in the visual, auditory, and somatosensory cortex, as well as in areas responsible for an integrated body schema.

One study examining EEG readings found frontal alpha wave overactivation and increased theta activity waves in the temporal region of the left hemisphere.

It is unclear whether genetics plays a role; however, there are many neurochemical and hormonal changes in individuals with depersonalization disorder. DPDR may be associated with dysregulation of the hypothalamic-pituitary-adrenal axis, the area of the brain involved in the "fight-or-flight" response. Patients demonstrate abnormal cortisol levels and basal activity. Studies found that patients with DPDR could be distinguished from patients with clinical depression and posttraumatic stress disorder.

The vestibular system may also play a role in DPDR. The vestibular system helps control balance, spatial orientation, motor coordination, but also plays a role in self-awareness. Disruption to this system can potentially cause a feeling of detachment from surroundings. Several studies have shown that patients with peripheral vestibular disease are also more likely to have dissociative symptoms when compared to healthy individuals.

Dissociative symptoms are sometimes described by those with neurological diseases, such as amyotrophic lateral sclerosis, Alzheimer's, multiple sclerosis (MS), etc., that directly affect brain tissue.

Diagnosis

Assessment
Diagnosis is based on the self-reported experiences of the person followed by a clinical assessment. Psychiatric assessment includes a psychiatric history and some form of mental status examination. Since some medical and psychiatric conditions mimic the symptoms of DPDR, clinicians must differentiate between and rule out the following to establish a precise diagnosis: temporal lobe epilepsy, panic disorder, acute stress disorder, schizophrenia, migraine, drug use, brain tumor or lesion. No laboratory test for depersonalization-derealization disorder currently exists. As patients with dissociative disorders likely experienced intense trauma in the past, concomitant dissociative disorders should be considered in patients diagnosed with a stress disorder (i.e. PTSD or acute stress disorder).

The diagnosis of depersonalization disorder can be made with the use of the following interviews and scales:

 The Structured Clinical Interview for DSM-IV Dissociative Disorders (SCID-D) is widely used, especially in research settings. This interview takes about 30 minutes to 1.5 hours, depending on individual's experiences.
 The Dissociative Experiences Scale (DES) is a simple, quick, self-administered questionnaire that has been widely used to measure dissociative symptoms. It has been used in hundreds of dissociative studies, and can detect depersonalization and derealization experiences.
 The Dissociative Disorders Interview Schedule (DDIS) is a highly structured interview which makes DSM-IV diagnoses of somatization disorder, borderline personality disorder and major depressive disorder, as well as all the dissociative disorders. It inquires about positive symptoms of schizophrenia, secondary features of dissociative identity disorder, extrasensory experiences, substance abuse and other items relevant to the dissociative disorders. The DDIS can usually be administered in 30–45 minutes.
 The Cambridge Depersonalization Scale (CDS) is a method for determining the severity of depersonalization disorder. It has been proven and accepted as a valid tool for the diagnosis of depersonalization disorder in a clinical setting. It is also used in a clinical setting to differentiate minor episodes of depersonalization from actual symptoms of the disorder. Due to the success of the CDS, a group of Japanese researchers underwent the effort to translate the CDS into the J-CDS or the Japanese Cambridge Depersonalization Scale. Through clinical trials, the Japanese research team successfully tested their scale and determined its accuracy. One limitation is that the scale does not allow for the differentiation between past and present episodes of depersonalization. It may be difficult for the individual to describe the duration of a depersonalization episode, and thus the scale may lack accuracy. The project was conducted in the hope that it would stimulate further scientific investigations into depersonalization disorder.

Diagnostic and Statistical Manual of Mental Disorders, 5th Edition (DSM-5) 
In the DSM-5, the word "derealization" was added to "depersonalization disorder" and renamed "depersonalization/derealization disorder" ("DPDR"). It remains classified as a dissociative disorder.

Patients must meet the following criteria to be diagnosed per the DSM-5:

 Presence of persistent/recurrent episodes of depersonalization/derealization
 Ability to distinguish between reality and dissociation during an episode (i.e. patient is aware of a perceptual disturbance)
 Symptoms are severe enough to interfere with social, occupational, or other areas of functioning
 Symptoms are not due to a substance or medication
 Symptoms are not due to another psychiatric disorder

International Classification of Diseases 11th Revision (ICD-11) 
The ICD-11 has relisted DPDR as a disorder rather than a syndrome as previously, and has also reclassified it as a dissociative disorder from its previous listing as a neurotic disorder. The description used in the ICD-11 is similar to the criteria found in the DSM-5. Individuals with DPDR are described as having persistent/recurrent symptoms of depersonalization/derealization, have intact reality testing, and symptoms are not better explained by another psychiatric/neural disorder, substance, medication, or head trauma. Symptoms are severe enough to cause distress or impairment in functioning.

Differential diagnoses 

DPDR differentials include neurologic and psychiatric conditions as well as side effects from illicit substances or medications.

Neurologic 

 Seizures
 Brain tumor
 Post-concussion syndrome
 Metabolic abnormalities
 Migraines
 Vertigo
 Meniere's disease

Psychiatric 

 Panic attack
 Phobias
 PTSD
 Acute stress syndrome
 Depression
 Schizophrenia
 Borderline personality disorder
 Other dissociative disorders

Consequence of psychoactive substance use 

 Marijuana
 Hallucinogens
 MDMA
 Ketamine
 Hallucinogen persisting perception disorder

Prevention 
Depersonalization-derealization disorder may be prevented by connecting children who have been abused with professional mental health help. Some trauma specialists suggest increasing inquiry into information about children's trauma history and exposure to violence, since the majority of people (about 80%) responsible for child maltreatment are the child's own parents. Trauma-specific intervention for children may be useful in preventing future symptoms. Another way to help prevent symptoms is by using "grounding techniques". Grounding techniques involve identifying objects, entities etc... using your five senses. For example, some psychologists recommend identifying five things you can see, four things you can touch, three things you can hear, two things you can smell, and one thing you can taste. Doing this brings the patient 'back to reality' as it helps relieve the anxiety that comes from the 'unknowingness' of one's DPDR.

Treatment
Treatment of DPDR is often difficult and refractory. Some clinicians speculate that this could be due to a delay in diagnosis by which point symptoms tend to be constant and less responsive to treatment. Additionally, symptoms tend to overlap with other diagnoses. Some results have been promising, but are hard to evaluate with confidence due to the small size of trials. However, recognizing and diagnosing the condition may in itself have therapeutic benefits, considering many patients express their problems as baffling and unique to them, but are in fact: one, recognized and described by psychiatry; and two, those affected by it are not the only individuals to be affected from the condition. However, symptoms are often transient and can remit on their own without treatment.

Treatment is primarily non-pharmacological and can include paradoxical intention, record keeping, positive reward, flooding, psychotherapy, cognitive-behavioral therapy, psychoeducation, self-hypnosis, and meditation. Meditation with the focus on the body has been used to achieve self awareness as it allows feelings, which otherwise are put aside or neutralized by the DPDR condition. Self-hypnosis training can be helpful and entails training patients to induce dissociative symptoms and respond in an alternative manner. Psychoeducation involves counseling regarding the disorder, reassurance, and emphasis on DPDR as a perceptual disturbance rather than a true physical experience. Clinical pharmacotherapy research continues to explore a number of possible options, including selective serotonin reuptake inhibitors (SSRI), benzodiazepines, stimulants and opioid antagonists (ex: naltrexone).

Cognitive behavioral therapy
An open study of cognitive behavioral therapy has aimed to help patients reinterpret their symptoms in a nonthreatening way, leading to an improvement on several standardized measures. A standardized treatment for DPDR based on cognitive behavioral principles was published in the Netherlands in 2011.

Medications
Neither antidepressants nor antipsychotics have been found to be useful; additionally, antipsychotics can worsen symptoms of depersonalisation. Tentative evidence supports use of naloxone and naltrexone.

A combination of an SSRI and a benzodiazepine has been proposed to be useful for DPDR patients with anxiety.

Modafinil used alone has been reported to be effective in a subgroup of individuals with depersonalization disorder (those who have attentional impairments, under-arousal and hypersomnia). However, clinical trials have not been conducted.

Repetitive transcranial magnetic stimulation (rTMS) 
Some studies have found repetitive transcranial magnetic stimulation (rTMS) to be helpful. One study examined 12 patients with DPDR that were treated with right temporoparietal junction (TPJ) rTMS and found that 50% showed improvement after three weeks of treatment. Five of the participants received an additional three weeks of treatment and reported overall a 68% improvement in their symptoms. Treating patients with rTMS specifically at the TPJ may be an alternative treatment.

Prognosis 
DPDR is typically chronic and continuous though some individuals report experiencing periods of remission. Exacerbations can be caused by psychologically stressful situations. Michal et al. (2016) analyzed a 2 case series on patients with DPDR and agreed that the condition tended to be chronic.

Epidemiology
Men and women are diagnosed in equal numbers with depersonalization disorder. A 1991 study on a sample from Winnipeg, Manitoba estimated the prevalence of depersonalization disorder at 2.4% of the population. A 2008 review of several studies estimated the prevalence between 0.8% and 1.9%. This disorder is episodic in about one-third of individuals, with each episode lasting from hours to months at a time. Depersonalization can begin episodically, and later become continuous at constant or varying intensity.

Onset is typically during the teenage years or early 20s, although some report being depersonalized as long as they can remember, and others report a later onset. The onset can be acute or insidious. With acute onset, some individuals remember the exact time and place of their first experience of depersonalization. This may follow a prolonged period of severe stress, a traumatic event, an episode of another mental illness, or drug use. Insidious onset may reach back as far as can be remembered, or it may begin with smaller episodes of lesser severity that become gradually stronger. Patients with drug-induced depersonalization do not appear to be a clinically separate group from those with a non-drug precipitant.

Relation to other psychiatric disorders 

Depersonalization exists as both a primary and secondary phenomenon, although making a clinical distinction appears easy, it is not absolute. The most common comorbid disorders are depression and anxiety, although cases of depersonalization disorder without symptoms of either do exist. Comorbid obsessive and compulsive behaviours may exist as attempts to deal with depersonalization, such as checking whether symptoms have changed and avoiding behavioural and cognitive factors that exacerbate symptoms. Many people with personality disorders such as schizoid personality disorder, schizotypal personality disorder, and borderline personality disorder will have high chances of having depersonalization disorder.

History 
The word depersonalization itself was first used by Henri Frédéric Amiel in The Journal Intime. The 8 July 1880 entry reads:

Depersonalization was first used as a clinical term by Ludovic Dugas in 1898 to refer to "a state in which there is the feeling or sensation that thoughts and acts elude the self and become strange; there is an alienation of personality – in other words a depersonalization". This description refers to personalization as a psychical synthesis of attribution of states to the self.

Early theories of the cause of depersonalization focused on sensory impairment. Maurice Krishaber proposed depersonalization was the result of pathological changes to the body's sensory modalities which lead to experiences of "self-strangeness" and the description of one patient who "feels that he is no longer himself". One of Carl Wernicke's students suggested all sensations were composed of a sensory component and a related muscular sensation that came from the movement itself and served to guide the sensory apparatus to the stimulus. In depersonalized patients, these two components were not synchronized, and the myogenic sensation failed to reach consciousness. The sensory hypothesis was challenged by others who suggested that patient complaints were being taken too literally and that some descriptions were metaphors – attempts to describe experiences that are difficult to articulate in words. Pierre Janet approached the theory by pointing out his patients with clear sensory pathology did not complain of symptoms of unreality, and that those who have depersonalization were normal from a sensory viewpoint.

Psychodynamic theory formed the basis for the conceptualization of dissociation as a defense mechanism. Within this framework, depersonalization is understood as a defense against a variety of negative feelings, conflicts, or experiences. Sigmund Freud himself experienced fleeting derealization when visiting the Acropolis in person; having read about it for years and knowing it existed, seeing the real thing was overwhelming and proved difficult for him to perceive it as real. Freudian theory is the basis for the description of depersonalization as a dissociative reaction, placed within the category of psychoneurotic disorders, in the first two editions of the Diagnostic and Statistical Manual of Mental Disorders.

Some argue that because depersonalization and derealization are both impairments to one's ability to perceive reality, they are merely two facets of the same disorder. Depersonalization also differs from delusion in the sense that the patient is able to differentiate between reality and the symptoms they may experience. The ability to sense that something is unreal is maintained when experiencing symptoms of the disorder. The problem with properly defining depersonalization also lies within the understanding of what reality actually is. In order to comprehend the nature of reality we must incorporate all the subjective experiences throughout and thus the problem of obtaining an objective definition is brought about again.

Society and culture
Depersonalization disorder has appeared in a variety of media. The director of the autobiographical documentary Tarnation, Jonathan Caouette, had depersonalization disorder. The screenwriter for the 2007 film Numb had depersonalization disorder, as does the film's protagonist played by Matthew Perry. Norwegian painter Edvard Munch's famous masterpiece The Scream may have been inspired by depersonalization disorder. In Glen Hirshberg's novel The Snowman's Children, main female plot characters throughout the book had a condition that is revealed to be depersonalization disorder. Suzanne Segal had an episode in her 20s that was diagnosed by several psychologists as depersonalization disorder, though Segal herself interpreted it through the lens of Buddhism as a spiritual experience, commonly known as "Satori" or "Samadhi". The song "Is Happiness Just a Word?" by hip hop artist Vinnie Paz describes his struggle with depersonalization disorder. Adam Duritz, of the band Counting Crows, has often spoken about his diagnosis of depersonalization disorder.

See also
Anosognosia

References

External links 
 

Dissociative disorders